Companion Wanted (French: Paris-Méditerranée) is a 1932 French comedy film directed by Joe May and starring Jean Murat, Annabella and José Noguéro. A separate German version Two in a Car was made, also directed by May.

Cast
 Jean Murat as Lord Kingdale  
 Annabella as Solange Pascaud  
 José Noguéro as Antonio Mirasol  
 Louis Florencie as Benoit  
 Frédéric Duvallès as Anatole Biscotte  
 Pierre Finaly as L'aubergiste  
 Henri Richard 
 Émile Riandreys 
 Georges Tréville 
 Charles Dechamps
 Louis Lorsy as Hotel Receptionist  
 Christiane Tourneur 
 Gaby Morlay 
 Louis Verneuil

References

Bibliography 
 Jonathan Driskell. The French Screen Goddess: Film Stardom and the Modern Woman in 1930s France. I.B.Tauris, 2015.

External links 
 

1932 films
1932 comedy films
French comedy films
1930s French-language films
Films directed by Joe May
French multilingual films
Films scored by Bruno Granichstaedten
Pathé films
French black-and-white films
1932 multilingual films
1930s French films